Velorcey is a commune in the Haute-Saône department in the region of Bourgogne-Franche-Comté in eastern France.

Velorcey is situated in the Haute-Saône (Bourgogne-Franche-Comté region) in the north-east of France at 19 km from Vesoul, the department capital. (General information: Velorcey is 312 km from Paris).

Popular places to visit nearby include Vesoul at 19 km and Ronchamp chapel at 29 km.

See also
Communes of the Haute-Saône department

References

Communes of Haute-Saône